Stay is the fourth studio album by Australian rock band Luca Brasi, released on 22 June 2018 by Cooking Vinyl. It was produced by Jimmy Balderston and Nic White with assistance from Darren Cordeux.

Background and promotion
The coordinates on the album cover, 42ºS 147ºE, are the coordinates for the state of Tasmania. Their first single from the album, "Got to Give", was released on 16 June 2017 with an accompanying music video for it following a month later. The band released the second single "Let it Slip" on 13 April 2018, with its corresponding music video releasing a month later. On 1 June, the band released their third single "Clothes I Slept In".

Shortly after the release of their single "Got to Give", they performed a national headline tour. The band performed a six-date national tour to promote album in August 2018. The band announced another national tour for 2019, this time for their single "The Clothes I Slept In". The tour is set to be the band's longest, spanning two months and twenty-one dates performing in regional hubs of all states.

Critical reception

Stay received positive reviews. Wall of Sound in a 6/10 review said: "If you love the Australian indie rock sounds favoured by Triple J at the moment, this album is for you. It’s emotive, uncomplicated and consistent.  If you like your rock heavier, then maybe give it a miss." Rating the album 8.5/10, Alexander Crowden of Beat said: "With Stay, Luca Brasi emerge as one of the country’s best rock bands, period." Hysteria rated the album 7/10 and praised vocalist Tyler Richardson saying: "As a vocalist, Richardson is at the top of his game on Stay. He carries the same raw bite and thick Tassie accent as is signature to Luca Brasi, but LP4 presents him biting with more passion than punkiness." Jonty Cornford of KillYourStereo scored the album 65/100 stating: "Given their track record, this isn’t so much a dip in quality as it is a gentle leaning back on the work that they’ve done to get where they are today."

Track listing
Track listing adapted from AllMusic.

Personnel
Distributed by Sony Music Australia.

Luca Brasi
 Tyler Richardson – lead vocals, bass
 Thomas Busby – lead guitar, backing vocals
 Patrick Marshall – rhythm guitar, vocals
 Danny Flood – drums

Production
 Jimmy Balderston – producer
 Nic White – producer
 Darren Cordeux – co-producer
 Jimmy Balderston – engineering
 Jason Livermore – mixing, mastering

Charts

Release history

References

2018 albums
Luca Brasi (band) albums